This is a list of writing occupations organized alphabetically. These are positions, jobs and occupations that typically entail creative, entertaining or informational writing.

Author
Blogger
Book coach
Commissioning editor
Copy editor
Creative consultant
Dog writer
Freelancer
Ghostwriter
Griot
Hack writer
Infopreneur
Investigative Journalist
Journalist
Literary editor
Manuscript format
Medical writing
Novelist
Poet
Polygraph (author)
Review
Screenwriter
Scribe
Script coordinator
Script doctor
Scrivener
Songwriter
Speechwriter
Staff writer
Technical writer
Website content writer
Writer

Writing